Island of Terror, also known as Night of the Silicates, is a 1966 British horror film released by Planet Film Productions. The film was released in the United States by Universal Studios on a double bill with The Projected Man (1967).

The idea for the film came when the producer Richard Gordon read Gerry Fernback's screenplay The Night the Silicates Came. Gordon partnered with Tom Blakey of Planet Films to produce the film.

David Robert Mitchell referenced Island of Terror's feeling of "waiting for the creature to pop up" as an inspiration for It Follows.

Plot

On the remote Petrie's Island off the east coast of Ireland a farmer, Ian Bellows, goes missing and his wife contacts the local constabulary. Constable John Harris finds Bellows dead in a cave without a single bone in his body and fetches the island's physician, Dr Reginald Landers, but Landers is unable to determine what happened. He journeys to the mainland to seek the help of a noted London pathologist, Dr Brian Stanley. Stanley too is unable even to hypothesise what could have happened, so both men seek out Dr David West, an expert on bones and bone diseases. Although Stanley and Landers interrupt West's quiet evening at home with the wealthy jetsetter Toni Merrill, West is intrigued by the problem and so agrees to accompany the two doctors back to Petrie's Island to examine the corpse. In order for them to reach the island that much faster, Merrill offers the use of her father's private helicopter in exchange for the three men allowing her to come along on the adventure.

Once back at Petrie's Island, Merrill's father's helicopter is forced to return to the mainland so he can use it, leaving the foursome effectively stranded on Petrie until the helicopter can return. West and Stanley learn that a group of oncology researchers led by Dr Lawrence Phillips, seeking a cure for cancer, have a secluded castle laboratory on the island. Paying a visit to Phillips' lab reveals that he and his colleagues are just as dead (and boneless) as Ian Bellows. Reasoning that whatever it is must have begun in that lab, West, Stanley and Landers gather up Phillips' notes and take them to study them. From them they learn that in his quest to cure cancer, Phillips may have accidentally created a new lifeform from the silicon atom.

Thinking the doctors are at the castle, Constable Harris bikes up there looking for them to tell them about the discovery of a dead, boneless horse, only to wander into the laboratory's "test animals" room and be attacked and killed by an offscreen tentacled creature, the result of Dr Phillips's experiments. The creatures are eventually dubbed "silicates" by West and Stanley, and kill their victims by injecting a bone-dissolving enzyme into their bodies. The silicates are also incredibly difficult to kill, as Landers learns when he tries and fails to kill one at the castle with an axe when they first encounter them.

After learning all they can from the late Dr  Phillips's notes, West and Stanley recruit the islanders, led by "boss" Roger Campbell and store owner Peter Argyle, to attack the silicates with anything they've got. Bullets, petrol bombs, and dynamite all fail to even harm the silicates. But when one is found dead, apparently having ingested a rare isotope called Strontium-90 from Phillips' lab (via Phillips' accidentally irradiated Great Dane), West and Stanley realise they must find more of the isotope at the castle and figure out how to contaminate the remaining silicates with it before it is too late. They obtain enough isotope to contaminate a herd of cattle – at the cost of Stanley's left hand, when he's grabbed by a silicate – and the silicates feed on these and begin to die.

The story ends with evacuation and medical teams inbound from the mainland, and West commenting on how fortunate they were that this outbreak was confined to an island. Had it happened on the mainland, he notes, they might never have stopped them in time. This sets up an epilogue and a visit to the satellite programme, in Japan, where the technicians are duplicating Phillips' work with the inevitable result. A technician walks down a corridor, hears a strange noise and investigates before screaming.

Cast
Peter Cushing as Dr Brian Stanley
Edward Judd as Dr David West
Carole Gray as Toni Merrill
Eddie Byrne as Dr Reginald Landers
Sam Kydd as Constable John Harris
Niall MacGinnis as Roger Campbell
James Caffrey as Peter Argyle
Liam Gaffney as Ian Bellows
Roger Heathcote as Dunley
Keith Bell as Halsey
Margaret Lacey as Old Woman
Shay Gorman as Morton
Peter Forbes-Robertson as Dr Lawrence Phillips
Richard Bidlake as Carson
Joyce Hemson as Mrs. Bellows

Release

Home media
DD Video released a collector's edition DVD on Jan 17, 2005. It was released on Blu-ray by Import Vendor on Oct 28, 2014.

Reception

Author and film critic Leonard Maltin awarded the film two out of a possible four stars. Maltin commended the film's acting and direction, but felt that the end result was "nothing special." AllMovie's Brian J. Dillard gave the film a mixed review, praising the film's electronic soundtrack, and Cushing and Grey's performances. Dillard also noted that the film was clunky and featured poor special effects. TV Guide awarded the film two out of four stars, criticizing the film's "shaky plot".

Radio Times criticized the film, calling it "long on logic but high on hysteria." DVD Talk gave it three and a half stars and called it "an immensely enjoyable sci-fi potboiler."

See also
Night of the Big Heat (1967 film)

References

External links 

 
 
 
 

1966 films
1966 horror films
British monster movies
British science fiction horror films
Films directed by Terence Fisher
Films scored by Malcolm Lockyer
1960s monster movies
1960s science fiction horror films
Universal Pictures films
Films set in castles
Films set in Ireland
1960s English-language films
1960s British films